Joe Palmisano (born c. 1954) is a former American football player and coach.  He served as the head football coach at Malone College from 1993 to 1994, compiling a record of 9–9–1.

Playing career
Palmisano played college football at Iowa State University in Ames, Iowa from 1972 until 1975, and graduated with a B.A. in 1976.

Coaching career

Malone College
Palmisano was the first head football coach for the Malone Pioneers located in Canton, Ohio and he held that position for two seasons, from 1993 until 1994.  His career coaching record at Malone was 9–9–1.  This ranks him fifth at Malone in total wins and third at Malone in winning percentage.

Other coaching positions
Palmisano worked at several other coaching positions in football.  At the University of Akron, he was recruiting coordinator and wide receivers coach in 1995 and 1996, defensive secondary head coach in 1997,  and in 1998 became the team's defensive coordinator where he remained until the conclusion of the 2000 season.  He later became a sports broadcaster for the college football games.

Palmisano later became an assistant coach with the Canton Legends of the American Indoor Football League.

Broadcasting career
Palmisano was the Saturday morning talk show from 8:00 a.m. to 11:00 a.m. on News-Talk 1480 WHBC in Canton, Ohio until 2021.

References

1950s births
Living people
Akron Zips football coaches
Iowa State Cyclones football players
Malone Pioneers football coaches